B.F. Keith's Theatre (1894–1928) in Boston, Massachusetts, was a vaudeville playhouse run by B.F. Keith. It sat across from Boston Common in the city's theatre district, with an entrance on Tremont Street and another on Washington Street. Personnel included Keith, E.F. Albee and H.E. Gustin. Virgilio Tojetti painted some of the interior decorations. In 1939, the theater was converted to a movie theater named the Normandie.

Performances/Screenings
 Fadettes of Boston
 Edison Vitascope
 Lumière Cinematograph

References

Further reading
 
 E.T. Adams. "Artistic Engine-Room Interiors." Engineering Magazine, v.10, no.6, March 1896
 Frank Cullen. Vaudeville old & new: an encyclopedia of variety performances in America. NY: Routledge, 2004

External links

 CinemaTreasures.org. B. F. Keith's Theatre, 547 Washington Street, Boston, MA 02458
 Library of Congress. Drawing of Shubert Apollo Theatre (formerly B.F. Keith's Theatre), Tremont St. opposite the Common, and B.F. Keith's Vaudeville, Washington St., Boston, Massachusetts, 1931.

Images

Former buildings and structures in Boston
1894 establishments in Massachusetts
1928 disestablishments in Massachusetts
Cultural history of Boston
20th century in Boston
Boston Theater District
Former theatres in Boston
Event venues established in 1894
Vaudeville theaters
Former cinemas in the United States